H. H. Gregg, Inc. (stylized as hhgregg or HHgregg on its website), is an American online retailer and former retail chain of consumer electronics and home appliances in the Midwest, Northeast, and Southeast United States, that operated stores in 20 states including Alabama, Delaware, Florida, Georgia, Illinois, Indiana, Kentucky, Louisiana, Maryland, Wisconsin, Mississippi, Missouri, New Jersey, North Carolina, Ohio, Pennsylvania, South Carolina, Tennessee, and Virginia. Valor Group LLC purchased the brand from the company's bankruptcy trustee for $400,000 in 2017. H.H. Gregg closed all stores in liquidation and had been operating as an online-only retailer since August that year.
Founded in Princeton, Indiana, in 1955, H. H. Gregg was headquartered in Indianapolis, Indiana, when it ceased operating.  Its retail offerings included home entertainment video and audio products, computers, and other selected consumer electronics; home appliances, such as refrigerators, ranges, dishwashers, freezers, washers, and dryers; and other products and services, including mattresses. The company announced on November 24, 2008, that it would begin selling popular gaming systems such as Wii, Xbox 360 and PlayStation 3.

H. H. Gregg reported an annual revenue of US$ 1.96 billion in fiscal year 2016.

On March 6, 2017, H. H. Gregg filed for Chapter 11 bankruptcy. The filing followed the decision to close 88 unprofitable locations outside of its core markets. Troubles for H. H. Gregg continued and the Chapter 11 case was ultimately converted to Chapter 7 liquidation. The company announced on April 7, 2017, that it would also close all of its other stores (132 more than the 88 previously announced closures) in the coming months and would lay off about 5,000 people.

History

In 1955, a small storefront was erected by Henry Harold and Fansy Gregg on the north side of Indianapolis. The new store featured home appliances, featuring washing machines, clothes dryers, refrigerators, and grills. Shortly thereafter, they began selling televisions and other electronics.

In 1975, Jerry W. Throgmartin began working in his grandfather's store while attending middle school. He eventually worked his way through many positions there over the next 24 years, and in 1999, took over his father's position as Chairman, CEO, and Director of H. H. Gregg Appliances and Electronics.

Dennis L. May succeeded Throgmartin as H. H. Gregg's president and Chief Executive Officer on February 17, 2009, and Throgmartin was named Executive Chairman of the Board. Throgmartin died in January 2012.

Despite market trends that have diminished profit margins on high-tech devices, Throgmartin and May expanded the business to 125 stores in 9 states as of October 2009. Throgmartin said, "We've been fortunate in that the areas of the [consumer electronics] business that have been strong are the areas in which we excel: high-end large-screen flat-panel TVs and home theater, and higher-end appliances".

On July 8, 2009, the company announced that it planned to open 22 stores in the following year, primarily in Richmond, Virginia, Tampa, Florida, and in Memphis, Tennessee, many of them being in buildings formerly occupied by defunct Circuit City, as part of an aggressive growth strategy to fill the gap created by Circuit City's bankruptcy. In December 2009, construction began on several stores in the central and eastern parts of Pennsylvania, the first in the state. March 2010 brought the openings of the first stores in the Norfolk-Virginia Beach metro area, in converted Circuit City and Linens 'n Things locations. In Spring 2011, the company expanded into the Youngstown, Ohio market with the opening of a store in the Youngstown suburb Boardman. Ten stores opened in July 2011 in South Florida along the east coast from Miami to West Palm Beach.

In the fall of 2010, H. H. Gregg opened several stores in former Circuit City locations in Maryland and Virginia. Also, in late 2010, hhgregg partnered with The Cellular Connection, a cellular phone wholesaler based out of Indianapolis, to roll out kiosks to sell Verizon Wireless products.

In March 2011, H. H. Gregg announced it would open a new location in Myrtle Beach, South Carolina, also in the location of a defunct Circuit City. In June 2011, H. H. Gregg expanded into the Pittsburgh market with the opening of four stores in the Pittsburgh metropolitan area. On September 15, 2011, 14 new stores opened in the Chicago area as well. In September 2012, H. H. Gregg opened four stores in the St. Louis, Missouri metropolitan area.

In August 2012, H. H. Gregg made its debut in Wisconsin by opening stores in Appleton, Brown Deer, Greenfield, Green Bay, and Racine. In November 2012, it entered Louisiana with stores in the New Orleans metropolitan area and in Baton Rouge.

The company's motto was "Gregg's Got It!", and their official mascot was an animated talking catalogue called HH, voiced by Wally Wingert and bearing likeness to that of the video-game character Rayman.

In February 2016, May resigned as CEO, and Robert Riesbeck was named interim CEO. In August 2016, Riesbeck was named the permanent CEO. After a buyout offer fell through, Riesbeck was terminated along with CIO Tom Schuetz and Chief Merchandising Officer Aaron Trahan. Kevin Kovacs (CFO at the time) was named CEO and president effective June 7, 2017.

Bankruptcy
On March 6, 2017, H. H. Gregg filed for Chapter 11 bankruptcy. The filing followed the closure of 88 unprofitable locations outside of its core markets. BML Investment Partners, L.P. acquired at least 7.5% of the company by January 26, 2017. On February 15, 2017 the company announced it was exploring "strategic alternatives", implicitly a sale of all or part of the business. On March 6, 2017, the bankrupt company filed for reorganization under Chapter 11. On March 16, 2017, the company announced that the sale had not been completed. On April 7, 2017, the Chapter 11 case was converted to Chapter 7 liquidation, and H.H. Gregg said it would close all 220 of its locations (the 88 stores previously announced to be closing, plus the other 132 locations) and lay off about 5,000 employees. All stores were closed permanently on May 25, 2017.

Sale of intellectual property
In June 2017, the H. H. Gregg brand and intellectual property was purchased by Valor Group LLC for $400,000. In August 2017, Valor Group LLC announced it would open an online business under the H. H. Gregg name. The online business operates out of Somerset, New Jersey.

The new online store named H.H. Gregg is not affiliated with the company that went out of business.  Customers have been told to contact the manufacturer directly for any issues with malfunctioning products sold by the former company. Extended warranties sold by the former company are being serviced by Warrantech.

On September 5, 2019, Valor Group LLC opened its first H. H. Gregg storefront in Franklin Township, NJ. In 2022, however, it was reported that the store had shuttered.

Fine Lines
Fine Lines was a division of H. H. Gregg that was introduced November 1, 2004. Products and brands varied by location. There were ten Fine Lines locations.

Stock
H. H. Gregg had its initial public offering on July 20, 2007, at US$13.72 and was traded on the New York Stock Exchange under the ticker symbol HGG.

On February 27, 2017, it was announced that the NYSE suspended trading of HGG in preparation for delisting. HGG shares were formally delisted on March 27, 2017, and became listed in OTC Pink.

Sponsorship
On December 17, 2007, H. H. Gregg signed as one of 14 founding corporate partners for the Lucas Oil Stadium, home of the NFL's Indianapolis Colts.  H. H. Gregg's deal earned them rights to advertise in the south gate and display many of their large, flat panel televisions. The south gate was also home to a new  H. H. Gregg showroom.

From late 2016 until the company's closing, H. H. Gregg sponsored several drivers on the Andretti Autosport team. They sponsored Carlos Muñoz and Marco Andretti. They were slated to become the full-time sponsor of Andretti in 2017, and sponsored them at St. Petersburg. When the company closed, the team removed their logos on their cars, although the logo remained on the firesuits. When Takuma Sato won the 2017 Indianapolis 500, the company logos were still seen on the left breast of his firesuit though H. H. Gregg had closed three days prior to the race.

References

External links

 Official website

Companies formerly listed on the New York Stock Exchange
Defunct companies based in Indianapolis
Defunct retail companies of the United States
American companies established in 1955
Retail companies established in 1955
Retail companies disestablished in 2017
American companies established in 2017
Retail companies established in 2017
Internet properties established in 2017
Consumer electronics retailers in the United States
Companies that filed for Chapter 11 bankruptcy in 2017
Companies that have filed for Chapter 7 bankruptcy
Re-established companies
1955 establishments in Indiana
2017 disestablishments in Indiana